No. 280 Squadron was a Royal Air Force air-sea rescue squadron during the second world war.

History
No. 280 Squadron was formed at RAF Thorney Island, England on 10 December 1941 as an air-sea rescue squadron. The squadron was equipped with the Avro Anson and was responsible for air-sea rescue along the south coast of England and East Anglia. The squadron re-equipped with the Vickers Warwick in October 1943.

At the end of the Second World War the squadron disbanded at RAF Thornaby on 21 June 1946.

Aircraft operated

See also
List of Royal Air Force aircraft squadrons

References

Notes

Bibliography

 Halley, James J. The Squadrons of the Royal Air Force and Commonwealth, 1918-1988. Tonbridge, Kent, UK: Air Britain (Historians) Ltd., 1988. .
 Jefford, C.G. RAF Squadrons: A Comprehensive Record of the Movement and Equipment of All RAF Squadrons and Their Antecedents Since 1912, Shrewsbury, Shropshire, UK: Airlife Publishing, 1988. . (second revised edition 2001. .)
 Rawlings, John D.R. Coastal, Support and Special Squadrons of the RAF and their Aircraft. London: Jane's Publishing Company Ltd., 1982. .

External links
 squadron histories nos. 276-280 sqn

Aircraft squadrons of the Royal Air Force in World War II
280 Squadron
Military units and formations established in 1941
Rescue aviation units and formations
Military units and formations disestablished in 1946